Hato Nuevo is a barrio in the municipality of Guaynabo, Puerto Rico. Its population in 2010 was 4,114.

Demographics

Hurricane Maria
Hurricane Maria, the deadly Category 5 hurricane that struck Puerto Rico on September 20, 2017, caused flooding and damaged infrastructure in Hato Nuevo. A bridge to replace a collapsed bridge in Hato Nuevo was completed and inaugurated on February 14, 2019, nearly a year and a half later.

Sectors
Barrios (which are roughly comparable to minor civil divisions) in turn are further subdivided into smaller local populated place areas/units called sectores (sectors in English). The types of sectores may vary, from normally sector to urbanización to reparto to barriada to residencial, among others.

The following sectors are in Hato Nuevo barrio:

See also

 List of communities in Puerto Rico
 List of barrios and sectors of Guaynabo, Puerto Rico

References

External links

Barrios of Guaynabo, Puerto Rico